Kate Corbett (born in Holyrood, Newfoundland and Labrador) is a Canadian actress.

Early years
Corbett started acting at a young age in small town repertoire summer theatre. Once graduating high school, Corbett moved to Toronto, Ontario to go to theatre school at Ryerson University. After obtaining her degree from Ryerson she landed the lead role on Family Biz (Canadian/France co pro) for YTV. She went on to  continue her training at the prestigious Canadian Film Centre's Acting Conservatory years later.

Career

Corbett's feature film credits include three Toronto International Film Festival film selections, The Steps (2015), Empire of Dirt (2013) and The Animal Project (2013); as well as the lead in Once There Was A Winter (2017). She has principal roles in the features Barn Wedding (2014) and How to Be Deadly (2014). Kate has also starred in several short films, including the award-winning How Eunice Got Her Baby (2009) and The Tunnel (2013), which was the Not Short on Talent recipient for Cannes Film Festival and for which she is also the credited writer.

Her television credits include:Good Witch, Fargo, Lost Girl, Signed, Sealed, Delivered, Odd Squad, Republic of Doyle, Satisfaction, Call Me Fitz, The L.A. Complex, InSecurity and Family Biz.

Some of Corbett's more recent theatre credits include; a "Canadian Stage" English premiere production of "Yukonstyle" by Sarah Berthiaume and directed by Ted Witzel. As well as, a "Tarragon Theatre" production of "Rocking the Cradle" by Des Walsh and directed by Richard Rose.

Filmography

Film

Television

|2022
| Murdoch Mysteries
|Mrs.Hadley
|TV film
|}

References

External links

 

Canadian television actresses
Living people
People from Holyrood, Newfoundland and Labrador
1986 births

it:Chapter Two